Shiro's Story is a three-part YouTube series, written, directed and narrated through the medium of rap by Rapman. It stars Joivan Wade as Shiro, Percelle Ascott as his best friend, Kyle, and has appearances from  Konan, Deno, Ashley Walters, Headie One, Not3s and Cadet. Themes of betrayal, love and London gang rivalry play throughout, but there is no glamorisation of violence.

The series was shot guerrilla-style on a budget of £3,000 and had been seen 7.2 million times as of early November 2019. The series as a whole has a run time of 45 minutes. Part 2 of the series won GRM Daily's Video of the Year award in 2018.

Rapman subsequently signed a contract with Island Records and Jay-Z's ROC Nation, and in late 2018, Paramount Pictures and BBC Films bought the rights for his feature film Blue Story.

Episodes 

Behind the scenes episode 1-4

See also
 Blue Story
 The Essence

References

YouTube original programming
British drama web series